Sarah Atcho (born 1 June 1995) is a Swiss sprinter. She competed in the 4 × 100 metres relay event at the 2015 World Championships in Beijing, at the 2016 Summer Olympics and at the 2017 World Championships in London.

In January 2022, Atcho announced that she had been diagnosed with pericarditis after receiving a COVID-19 vaccination booster shot. After a six-week break from training, she was able to resume her training.

References

External links
 

1995 births
Living people
Swiss people of Moroccan descent
Swiss people of Ivorian descent
Swiss female sprinters
World Athletics Championships athletes for Switzerland
Sportspeople from Lausanne
Athletes (track and field) at the 2016 Summer Olympics
Olympic athletes of Switzerland
Olympic female sprinters
Universiade medalists in athletics (track and field)
Universiade gold medalists for Switzerland
21st-century Swiss women